BioSerenity is medtech company created in 2014 that develops ambulatory medical devices to help diagnose and monitor patients with chronic diseases such as epilepsy. The medical devices are composed of medical sensors, smart clothing, a smartphone app for Patient Reported Outcome, a web platform to perform data analysis through Medical Artificial Intelligence for detection of digital biomarkers. The company initially focused on Neurology a domain in which it reported contributing to the diagnosis of 30 000 patients per year. It now also operates in Sleep Disorders and Cardiology. BioSerenity reported it provides pharmaceutical companies with solutions for companion diagnostics.

Company history 
BioSerenity was founded in 2014, by Pierre-Yves Frouin. The company was initially hosted in the ICM Institute (Institut du Cerveau et de la Moëlle épinière), in Paris, France.

Fund Raising

 June 8, 2015 : The company raises a $4 million seed round with Kurma Partners and IdInvest Partners
 September 20, 2017 : The company raises a $17 million series A round with LBO France, IdInvest Partners and BPI France
 June 18, 2019 : The company raises a $70 million series B round with Dassault Systèmes, IdInvest Partners, LBO France et BPI France

Acquisitions

In 2019, BioSerenity announces the acquisition of the American Company SleepMed and working with over 200 Hospitals.

In 2020, Bioserenity is one of the five French manufacturers (Savoy, BB Distrib, Celluloses de Brocéliande, Chargeurs) working on the production of sanitary equipment including FFP2 masks at request of the French government.

In 2021, the Neuronaute would be used by approximately 30,000 patients per year.

Awards 
 BioSerenity is one of the Disrupt 100
 BioSerenity joins the Next40
 BioSerenity selected by Microsoft and AstraZeneca in their initiative AI Factory for Health
 BioSerenity accelerated at Stanford's University StartX program

References

External links 
 
 FDA Clearance Neuronaute
 FDA Clearance Cardioskin
 FDA Clearance Accusom

Healthcare companies of France
Machine learning
Health care companies established in 2014
French companies established in 2014